Political and Economic Planning (PEP) was a British policy think tank, formed in 1931 in response to Max Nicholson's article A National Plan for Britain published in February of that year in Gerald Barry's magazine The Week-End Review.

History
The original members included Nicholson and Barry, the zoologist Julian Huxley, the agronomist Leonard Elmhirst, the financier Basil Phillott Blackett, the civil servants Dennis Routh and Sir Henry Bunbury, the research chemist Michael Zvegintzov, and Israel Sieff, a director of Marks & Spencer.  Sieff was Chairman in the 1930s, followed by Elmhirst in 1939 and by Nicholson in 1953. It was a non-governmental planning organisation financed by corporations.

This prolific organisation was influential in the formation of the National Health Service, World War II and post-war planning, and the development of the African colonies.  After the war it shared the offices of The Nature Conservancy in Belgrave Square, London, producing reports such as Opportunities in Industry (1957) and Advisory Committees in British Government (1960)

In 1978 PEP merged with the Centre for the Study of Social Policy (CSSP), and became the Policy Studies Institute (PSI).

Chairmen
 1931—1939: Israel Sieff
 1939—1953: Leonard Elmhirst
 1953—1978: Max Nicholson

See also 
Planisme

References

External links
 Catalogue of the PEP papers at the Archives Division of the London School of Economics.

Political history of the United Kingdom
Political and economic think tanks based in the United Kingdom